Timothy Matlack (March 28, 1736 – April 14, 1829) was an American politician, military officer and businessman. A brewer and beer bottler who emerged as a popular and powerful leader in the American Revolutionary War, Matlack served as Secretary of Pennsylvania during the conflict and was a delegate to the Second Continental Congress in 1780. Matlack was known for his excellent penmanship, and in 1776 was chosen to inscribe the original United States Declaration of Independence on vellum.

Matlock became one of Pennsylvania's most provocative and influential political figures, but he was removed from office by his political enemies at the end of the war; however, he returned to power in the Jeffersonian era.

Biography
Timothy Matlack was born in Haddonfield, New Jersey on March 28, 1736, to Elizabeth Martha Burr Haines and Timothy Matlack. His grandparents were William Matlack and Mary Hancock, and Henry Burr and Elizabeth Hudson. His siblings were Sybil, Elizabeth, Titus, Seth, Josiah, and White Matlack; his half siblings were Reuben Haines and Mary Haines. His first cousin was Quaker abolitionist John Woolman. In 1738, the family moved to Philadelphia, and he was apprenticed to the prosperous Quaker merchant John Reynell in 1749. At the end of his term, he married Ellen Yarnall, the daughter of Quaker minister Mordecai Yarnall, and their children were William, Mordecai, Sibyl, Catharine, and Martha.

In 1760, Matlack opened a store called the Case Knife, and he and Owen Biddle purchased a steel furnace in Trenton, New Jersey in 1762. His shop failed in 1765, and he was disowned by the Quakers who complained that he had been "frequenting company in such a manner as to spend too much of his time from home". He was confined to debtors' prison in 1768 and 1769. By 1769, he had set up a new business selling bottled beer and opened his own brewery near Independence Hall. 

In 1774 Matlack was hired by Charles Thomson, Secretary of the First Continental Congress, to engross (transcribe) an address to the King of England. In May, 1775, he became clerk to the Second Continental Congress and in June he composed George Washington's commission as General and Commander-in-Chief of the army of the United Colonies. Congress elevated him to Storekeeper of Military Supplies. He was also a member of Philadelphia's Committee of Inspection and Secretary of the Committee of Officers of the city's three militia battalions. Philadelphia added two more battalions to its militia brigade in January 1776, and Matlack was elected Colonel of the Fifth Battalion of Rifle Rangers. He was a delegate to the Conference of Committees which met in June to plan a new constitution for Pennsylvania. Later that month, he engrossed the United States Declaration of Independence on parchment, and members of Congress began signing it on August 2.

Matlack was instrumental in drafting the Pennsylvania Constitution of 1776, and he ardently defended it against such critics as Benjamin Rush, James Wilson, and John Dickinson. Newspapers were his primary medium and he signed a number of articles with the pseudonym Tiberius Gracchus. As Secretary to the Supreme Executive Council of Pennsylvania, Matlack was one of the most powerful men in the new state during the war years. In 1780, his government passed an Act for the Gradual Abolition of Slavery.

The Philadelphia and Pennsylvania militia crossed the Delaware River with Washington on December 27, 1776, and Colonel Matlack and his 5th Rifle Battalion were part of the expedition. Washington credited the Pennsylvania militia for their timely service in this campaign, and other officers commended the force for its manliness and spirit. Following the British occupation of Philadelphia, Washington assigned Benedict Arnold to the post of Commandant of Philadelphia, and Matlack learned to despise the man's presence. He led an investigation of his wrongdoing which triggered a court martial, and the court sentenced Arnold to be reprimanded by the Commander-in-Chief. Washington said that his officer's behavior had been "reprehensible"; Arnold's treason was discovered five months later.

Matlack was named a trustee of the University of the State of Pennsylvania in 1779. In 1780, he was elected a member of the American Philosophical Society and served as its Secretary from 1781-1783. He was among the founders of The Religious Society of Free Quakers in 1781, Quakers who had been "disowned" for their support of the American war for independence. He was also one of the earliest opponents of slavery in America, and he felt that the Quakers were not moving quickly enough on abolition. He helped raise a substantial sum of money to construct the Free Quaker Meeting House at the corner of Fifth and Arch streets in downtown Philadelphia, along with Benjamin Franklin, Robert Morris. 

In 1790, Matlack was commissioned to survey the "headwaters of the Susquehanna River and the streams of the New Purchase," the northwestern portion of the state purchased from the American Indians.  They were also charged with exploring a route for a passageway to connect the West Branch with the Allegheny River. He lived in Lancaster, Pennsylvania from 1799 until 1808 when Lancaster was the capital of Pennsylvania, and he worked as a clerk of the Pennsylvania State Senate. He was known for his household garden, which included 28 types of peach tree. He died in Holmesburg, Pennsylvania on April 14, 1829 and was interred in the Free Quaker Burial Ground on South Fifth Street, Philadelphia.  His remains were removed in 1905 and reinterred in the Wetherill Cemetery opposite Valley Forge.

In popular culture
 In the 2004 film, National Treasure, Matlack is mentioned by Ben Gates (Nicolas Cage) after solving this riddle engraved on a Meerschaum pipe, "The legend writ, the stain affected, the key in Silence undetected, fifty five in iron pen, Mr. Matlack can't offend." Although 56 delegates signed the document, Gates goes on to say, "Timothy Matlack was the official scribe of the Continental Congress, calligrapher not writer. And to make sure he could not offend the map, it was put on the back of a resolution that he transcribed. A resolution that 55 men signed, The Declaration of Independence."

 The font, American Scribe is inspired by Matlack's penmanship.

Notes
Coelho, Chris. Timothy Matlack: Scribe of the Declaration of Independence. Jefferson, NC: McFarland, 2013.
Fanelli, Doris Devine, Karie Diethorn and John C. Milley. History of the Portrait Collection, Independence National Historical Park. Philadelphia: American Philosophical Society, 2001.
Johnson, Allen and Dumas Malone, eds. Dictionary of American Biography. New York: Charles Scribner & Sons, 1933, vol 12, pp 409–410
Landis, Bertha Cochran. Col. Timothy Matlack. Papers read before the Lancaster County Historical Society, Vol. XLII-No.6; Lancaster, PA: 1938.
Stackhouse, A. M. Col. Timothy Matlack, Patriot and Soldier. [N.p.]: Privately printed, 1910.
Wetherill, Charles. History of The Religious Society of Friends Called by Some The Free Quakers, in the City of Philadelphia. Philadelphia: Printed for the Society, 1894
Yarnall, John K. Yarnall Family Record in America from 1683 to 1913. Chicago, Dec. 1913.; William Wade Hinshaw, Encyclopedia of American Quaker Genealogy, Vol. II - Philadelphia MM records.

References

External links
Biography, Timothy Matlack at the University of Pennsylvania
Free Quaker Meeting House architectural drawing by Timothy Matlack, Library of Congress

1730 births
1829 deaths
Continental Congressmen from Pennsylvania
18th-century American politicians
Pennsylvania militiamen in the American Revolution
American revolutionaries
People of New Jersey in the American Revolution
American abolitionists
Penmanship
American Quakers
University of Pennsylvania people
Politicians from Philadelphia
Politicians from Lancaster, Pennsylvania
People from Haddonfield, New Jersey
People of colonial New Jersey
People of colonial Pennsylvania
Businesspeople from Lancaster, Pennsylvania
Quaker abolitionists
United States Declaration of Independence